Steketee is a surname. Notable people include:

 Frank Steketee (1900–1951), All American football player
 Mark Steketee (born 1994), Australian cricketer
 Sallie Steketee (1882–?), American painter
 Scott Steketee (born 1947), American rower at the 1968 Summer Olympics